Levy Lee Simon is an American playwright, actor, director and screenwriter, perhaps best known for his trilogy about the struggle for Haitian independence, For the Love of Freedom.

Biography
Levy "Lee" Simon, Jr. was born in Harlem, New York.  While an undergraduate at Cheyney State College in Pennsylvania in the early 1980s, Levy first became seriously interested in the theatre. His girlfriend had purchased tickets for them to see For Colored Girls Who Have Considered Suicide When the Rainbow Is Enuf. "The Lady in Red", a character in the play, performed a piece about Toussaint L'Ouverture, which inspired Simon to learn more about the Haitian revolt. This eventually led to the development of his trilogy For the Love of Freedom. Other plays by Simon include: The Bow-Wow Club and God, the Crackhouse, and the Devil, Same Train, The Stuttering Preacher, The Guest at Central Park West, Caseload, Pitbulls and Daffodils, The Last Revolutionary, 'The Magnificent Dunbar Hotel and, Gentrified - Metaphor of the Drums..

His screenplay adaptation of The Bow-Wow Club was optioned by Fox Searchlight and Spirit Dance, Forest Whitaker's production company.

He also was cast as Junior in the Arena Stage production of Before It Hits Home.

Selected plays
See Doollee.com:
 The Bow-Wow Club Caseload For the Love of Freedom God, the Crackhouse and the Devil The Guest at Central Park West' Same Train The Stuttering Preacher Smell the Power
 Pitbulls and Daffodils 
 The Magnificent Dunbar Hotel
 The Last Revolutionary
 Gentrified - Metaphor of the Drums
 Fractured

Honors and awards
 1999: Kennedy Center/ACTF Lorraine Hansberry Award - The Bow-Wow Club2001: NAACP Best Playwright nomination - For the Love of Freedom, Part I: Toussaint - the Soul - Rise and Revolution2003: Ovation Award nomination - For the Love of Freedom, Part II: Dessalines - The Heart - Blood and Liberation2006: NAACP Theatre Award nomination, "Best Playwright" - For the Love of Freedom, Part III: Christophe - the Spirit - Passion and Glory2007: Audelco Award, Best Playwright for The Guest at Central Park West'', Best Dramatic Production of the Year and Best Playwright.

References

External links 
Dramatic Publishing (Biography)
NPR (includes excerpts from For the Love of Freedom)
Robey Theatre Company - Reviews of For the Love of Freedom, Pt. 1
Robey Theatre Company - Reviews of For the Love of Freedom, Pt. 2
Robey Theatre Company - Reviews of For the Love of Freedom, Pt. 3

Year of birth missing (living people)
Living people
African-American dramatists and playwrights
American dramatists and playwrights
Writers from New York City
Cheyney University of Pennsylvania alumni
21st-century African-American people